The 2008 League of Ireland Premier Division was the 24th season of the League of Ireland Premier Division. The division was made up of 12 teams. Bohemians were champions while St Patrick's Athletic finished as runners-up.

Club information

Overview
The regular season began on 7 March and concluded on 14 November. Each team played the other teams three times, totaling 33 games. Bohemians finished the season as champions, winning by a margin of nineteen points. There was no promotion/relegation play-off between Premier Division and First Division teams. This was because the 2009 Premier Division would be reduced to 10 clubs. This saw three clubs relegated out of the Premier Division.

For the first time in the history of the league the national broadcaster Raidió Teilifís Éireann started showing highlights of every Premier Division game played on its new show Monday Night Soccer. This show was presented by Con Murphy. This replaced eircom League Weekly which had run on TV3 on Monday nights from 2002 to 2007. The final season of live weekly radio coverage was provided by national broadcaster RTÉ with live reports and commentary on match nights, which was dropped from the end of 2008. Live games were shown by RTÉ, Setanta Sports and TG4's  Sacar Beo.

Final table

Results

Matches 1–22

Matches 23–33

Top scorers

Gallery

See also
 2008 League of Ireland First Division
 2008 League of Ireland Cup
 2008 A Championship

References

 
1
League of Ireland Premier Division seasons
1
Ireland
Ireland